Neo-psychedelia is a diverse genre of psychedelic music that draws inspiration from the sounds of 1960s psychedelia, either updating or copying the approaches from that era. Originating in the 1970s, it has occasionally seen mainstream pop success but is typically explored within alternative rock scenes. It initially developed as an outgrowth of the British post-punk scene, where it was also known as acid punk. After post-punk, neo-psychedelia flourished into a more widespread and international movement of artists who applied the spirit of psychedelic rock to new sounds and techniques.

Neo-psychedelia may also include forays into psychedelic pop, jangly guitar rock, heavily distorted free-form jams, or recording experiments. A wave of British alternative rock in the 1980s spawned the subgenres dream pop and shoegazing.

Characteristics

Neo-psychedelic acts borrowed a variety of elements from 1960s psychedelic music. Some emulated the psychedelic pop of bands like the Beatles and early Pink Floyd, others adopted Byrds-influenced guitar rock, or distorted free-form jams and sonic experimentalism of the 1960s. Some neo-psychedelia has been explicitly focused on drug use and experiences, and like acid house of the same age, projects transitory, ephemeral, and trance-like experiences. Other bands have used neo-psychedelia to accompany surreal or political lyrics.

In the view of author Erik Morse: "The distinctions between British and American neo-psychedelia were best described as the differences between primitivism and primalism. The sounds of American neo-psychedelia emphasized the cryptic margins of avant-rock, incorporating evanescent textures over an immutable bassline, producing a 'heavy' metallic ambience, contra-distinct to the sing-song filigree of British psychedelia".

History

1970s–80s: Post-punk

Psychedelic rock declined towards the end of the 1960s, as bands broke up or moved into new forms of music, including heavy metal music and progressive rock. Like the psychedelic developments of the late 1960s, punk rock and new wave in the 1970s challenged the rock music establishment. At the time, "new wave" was a term used interchangeably with the nascent punk rock explosion. In 1978, journalist Greg Shaw categorized a subset of new wave music as "neo-psychedelia", citing Devo, "to an extent ... [its] first major indication ... [they are] the new darling of the new wave press and opinion-makers, yet nothing about it is remotely 'punk'". Shaw wrote that in England, neo-psychedelia was known as "acid punk", noting "self-advertised 'psychedelic punk' band, the Soft Boys, [are] being hotly pursued by several major labels."

By 1978–79, new wave was considered independent from punk and post-punk (the latter was initially known as "new musick"). Author Clinton Heylin marks the second half of year 1977 and the first half of year 1978 as the "true starting-point for English post-punk". Some of the scene's bands, including the Soft Boys, the Teardrop Explodes, Wah!, and Echo & the Bunnymen, became major figures of neo-psychedelia. In the early 1980s, Siouxsie and the Banshees crafted a "exotic neo-psychedelic pop" with the arrival of guitarist John McGeoch.

The early 1980s Paisley Underground movement followed neo-psychedelia. Originating in Los Angeles, the movement saw a number of young bands who were influenced by the psychedelia of the late 1960s and all took different elements of it. The term "Paisley Underground" was later expanded to include others from outside the city.

1980s–present

In the 1980s and 1990s there were occasional mainstream acts that dabbled in neo-psychedelia, including Prince's mid-1980s work and some of Lenny Kravitz's 1990s output, but neo-psychedelia has mainly been the domain of alternative and indie rock bands.  The late 1980s would see the birth of shoegazing, which, among other influences, took inspiration from 1960s psychedelia. Reynolds referred to this movement as "a rash of blurry, neo-psychedelic bands" in a 1992 article in The Observer.

AllMusic states: "Aside from the early-'80s Paisley Underground movement and the Elephant 6 collective of the late 1990s, most subsequent neo-psychedelia came from isolated eccentrics and revivalists, not cohesive scenes." They go on to cite what they consider some of the more prominent artists: the Church, Nick Saloman's Bevis Frond, Spacemen 3, Robyn Hitchcock, Mercury Rev, the Flaming Lips, and Super Furry Animals. According to Treblezines Jeff Telrich: "Primal Scream made [neo-psychedelia] dancefloor ready. The Flaming Lips and Spiritualized took it to orchestral realms. And Animal Collective—well, they kinda did their own thing."

List of artists

See also
 Madchester

Notes

References

Bibliography
 
 
 
 
 

 
Alternative rock genres
American rock music genres
American styles of music
British styles of music
British rock music genres
Psychedelic music